Or else may refer to:

 The short-circuit operator or
 A short story in the collection Or Else, the Lightning God & Other Stories